Robert Peter Deeley (June 18, 1946) is an American prelate of the Roman Catholic Church, serving since 2013 as bishop of the Diocese of Portland in Maine.  He previously served as an auxiliary bishop of the Archdiocese of Boston in Massachusetts from 2012 to 2013.

Biography

Early life and education
Robert Deeley was born on June 18, 1946, in Cambridge, Massachusetts to Michael and Mary Deeley, both from County Galway, Ireland.  In 1964, after graduating from Matignon High School in Cambridge, Massachusetts, Deeley went to Cardinal O’Connell Minor Seminary in Boston. After two years, Deeley received the Basselin Foundation Scholarship and attended the Catholic University of America in Washington, D.C.  After graduating in 1968 with a Bachelor of Arts degree, he entered the Pontifical North American College in Rome, earning a Bachelor of Sacred Theology degree at the Pontifical Gregorian University in 1972.

Ordination and ministry
On July 14, 1973, Deeley was ordained a priest for the Archdiocese of Boston by Cardinal Humberto Medeiros in his home parish of Sacred Heart in Watertown, Massachusetts. Following his ordination, Deeley served as an associate pastor and then as secretary to the Metropolitan Tribunal of the archdiocese.  In 1981, he returned to the Gregorian University, where he earned a Licentiate of Canon Law in 1983, and a Doctor of Canon Law summa cum laude in 1986.  His dissertation was entitled: "The Mandate for Those who Teach Theology in Institutes of Higher Studies: An Interpretation of the Meaning of Canon 812 of the Code of Canon Law."

Back in Boston, Deeley served in various capacities in the Metropolitan Tribunal before being called to work in the Congregation for the Doctrine of the Faith by Cardinal Joseph Ratzinger in 2004.  He kept this position in Rome until 2010, when he returned to Boston to be named vicar general and moderator of the curia in 2011. Deeley was named a prelate of honor in 1995 by Pope John Paul II. giving him the title of "monsignor." Deeley served as president of the Canon Law Society of America in 2000.

Auxiliary Bishop of Boston

On November 9, 2012, Pope Benedict XVI named Deeley as an auxiliary bishop of the Archdiocese of Boston and titular bishop of Kearney. He was consecrated on January 4, 2013, at the Cathedral of the Holy Cross in Boston by Cardinal Seán O'Malley.  Archbishop John Nienstedt and Bishop Robert Evans served as co-consecrators.  Deeley chose "Veritatem facere in caritate" ("Living the truth in love") from St. Paul's Letter to the Ephesians as his episcopal motto, because he believes that is "the heart of our challenge in the Church today."

Deeley was the third president of the Canon Law Society to be named bishop by Benedict XVI, joining Bishop Randolph Calvo and Bishop Mark Bartchak.

Bishop of Portland
On December 18, 2013, Pope Francis appointed Deeley as bishop of the Diocese of Portland.  He was installed at the Cathedral of the Immaculate Conception in Portland, Maine, on February 14, 2014.

On September 16, 2016, a Maine man sued Deeley, claiming that he had been sexually abused as a child by two diocese priests.  The unnamed plaintiff was serving a 60-year sentence for the murder of his grandfather in 1986.

See also

 Catholic Church hierarchy
 Catholic Church in the United States
 Historical list of the Catholic bishops of the United States
 List of Catholic bishops of the United States
 Lists of patriarchs, archbishops, and bishops

References

External links
Roman Catholic Archdiocese of Boston
Roman Catholic Diocese of Portland official website

Episcopal succession

 

1946 births
Living people
American Roman Catholics
People from Cambridge, Massachusetts
Pontifical Gregorian University alumni
Catholic University of America alumni
Pontifical North American College alumni
Roman Catholic bishops of Portland
Roman Catholic Archdiocese of Boston
American Roman Catholic clergy of Irish descent
21st-century Roman Catholic bishops in the United States
Religious leaders from Massachusetts
Catholics from Massachusetts